Aleksandr Andreyevich Kalyashin (born 24 January 1995) is a Russian football defender. He plays for FC Znamya Truda Orekhovo-Zuyevo.

Club career
He made his debut in the Russian Second Division for FC Akademiya Tolyatti on 30 April 2012 in a game against FC Zenit-Izhevsk Izhevsk.

He made his Russian Football Premier League debut for FC Dynamo Moscow on 17 October 2015 in a game against FC Amkar Perm.

References

External links
 
 

1995 births
People from Svobodny, Amur Oblast
Sportspeople from Amur Oblast
Living people
Russian footballers
Russia youth international footballers
Russia under-21 international footballers
Association football defenders
FC Dynamo Moscow players
FC Dynamo Stavropol players
FC Chayka Peschanokopskoye players
Sevan FC players
FC Znamya Truda Orekhovo-Zuyevo players
Russian Premier League players
Russian Second League players
Armenian First League players
Russian expatriate footballers
Expatriate footballers in Armenia